Adolf Otto Jordan (January 5, 1880 in Pittsburgh, Pennsylvania – December 23, 1972 in West Allegheny, Pennsylvania), is a former professional baseball player who played second base for the  Brooklyn Superbas during the 1903 and 1904 baseball seasons.

External links

1880 births
1972 deaths
Major League Baseball second basemen
Brooklyn Superbas players
Baseball players from Pennsylvania
Minor league baseball managers
Binghamton Bingoes players
Atlanta Crackers managers
Atlanta Crackers players
Chattanooga Lookouts players
Memphis Chickasaws players
Valdosta Millionaires players
Dallas Giants players
Brenham Brewers players